Lonate Pozzolo is a town and comune located in the province of Varese, in the Lombardy region of northern Italy. It is served by Ferno-Lonate Pozzolo railway station.

The airline Cargoitalia had its head office in the Avioport Logistics Park in Lonate Pozzolo.

Twin towns 

 San Rafael, USA

References

External links

 Comune of Lonate Pozzolo 

Cities and towns in Lombardy